The St. Augustine's Falcons are the athletic teams that represent St. Augustine's University, located in Raleigh, North Carolina, in NCAA Division II intercollegiate sports. The Falcons compete as members of the Central Intercollegiate Athletic Association for all 13 varsity sports. The Falcons have been members of the CIAA since 1933.

Saint Augustine's holds the distinction as the most decorated Division II athletics program, with a record 37 NCAA team titles and 265 individual titles. This also places them as the fourteenth-most productive athletics program across all three divisions. All of those championships have come in either men's indoor (13 team, 75 individual), women's indoor (6 team, 41 individual), men's outdoor (14 team, 105 individual), or women's outdoor (4 team, 44 individual) track and field.

Varsity teams

List of teams

Men's sports
 Basketball
 Baseball
 Cross Country
 Football
 Golf
 Track & Field

Women's sports
 Basketball
 Bowling
 Cross Country
 Softball
 Track & Field
 Volleyball

National championships
As of the 2018–19 season, the Falcons have won 38 team national titles, the most of any active Division II athletics program.

References

External links